Hammer Dome, is a granite dome in the Tuolumne Meadows area of Yosemite National Park. Hammer Dome is a bit north, of Cathedral Creek, which has its source, near Cathedral Peak. Hammer Dome is loosely northwest of Fairview Dome, is north of both Medlicott Dome and Pywiack Dome, all three of which are south of California State Route 120, which runs through Tuolumne Meadows to Tioga Pass. North and South Whizz Domes are close.

It is recommended that visitors bring mosquito repellent.

On Hammer Dome's particulars

Hammer Dome has a few rock climbing routes.

References

External links and references

 Notes on rock climbing Hammer Dome
 Notes on how to get to Hammer Dome

Granite domes of Yosemite National Park